Charles Jones Bethel (born March 3, 1976) is an associate justice of the Supreme Court of Georgia. He is a former Judge of the Georgia Court of Appeals. Before his judicial tenure, he served as Senator in the Georgia General Assembly from Dalton, Georgia. Bethel was first elected Senator in the 2010 general election and served Georgia's 54th district—a constituency which includes Murray and Whitfield counties, and portions of Gordon and Pickens counties as well.

Early life and education
Charlie Bethel graduated cum laude in 1998 from the University of Georgia's Terry College of Business with a Bachelor of Business Administration in business management. He stayed with the University of Georgia, graduating with a Juris Doctor from the  University of Georgia School of Law in 2001. Bethel was admitted to the State Bar of Georgia in 2001 and practiced law from 2003–2005. He is admitted to practice law in all of Georgia's state courts, the United States District Court for the Northern District of Georgia, and the Supreme Court of the United States. Bethel was an assistant solicitor for the city of Dalton from 2003–2004.

Political career
Bethel was elected in 2010 and sworn into the Georgia Senate in 2011. Bethel was a three-term Senator and sat on the Senate Government Oversight, Insurance and Labor, Judiciary, Judiciary Non-Civil, and Reapportionment and Redistricting committees.

Judicial career

Georgia Court of Appeals
On November 9, 2016, the day after being elected to his fourth Senate term, Bethel was appointed to be a Judge of the Georgia Court of Appeals by Governor Nathan Deal. He assumed the seat of Michael P. Boggs who was appointed to the Supreme Court of Georgia. He took the bench on January 1, 2017, for a term that would have ended on December 31, 2018.

Georgia Supreme Court
On September 14, 2018, Governor Deal appointed Bethel to the Supreme Court of Georgia to fill the seat vacated by the retirement of Harris Hines. He was sworn into office on October 2, 2018.

References

External links
 Welcome to the Georgia General Assembly  Legis.ga.gov. Retrieved June 28, 2013.

1976 births
Living people
Georgia Court of Appeals judges
Republican Party Georgia (U.S. state) state senators
People from Dalton, Georgia
University of Georgia alumni
University of Georgia School of Law alumni
21st-century American politicians
21st-century American judges
Justices of the Supreme Court of Georgia (U.S. state)